Hangfire is the sixth novel of the military science fiction StarFist Saga by American writers David Sherman and Dan Cragg. This installment of Starfist contains three significant and independent plots, one involving members of third platoon, Company L, and the second involves Brigadier Sturgeon, the FIST commander.  In the third plotline, the alien race called by the Marines "Skinks" are shown conducting operations of their own.

Plot summary

Three Marines of Company L are sent on a secret mission to the mob-controlled resort world of Havanagas. Lance Corporals Claypoole and Dean – under the command of Corporal Pasquin – are to find proof of mob control — proof that Confederation law enforcement agents have not been able to secure — so that the gangsters can be brought to justice.

Brigadier Sturgeon, the FIST commander, ostensibly goes on leave. Instead of vacationing he travels to Marine Corps Headquarters on Earth to find out why 34th FIST seems to have been quietly "quarantined," with nobody being rotated out of the unit, even though it is considered a hardship post. This potentially career-endangering "back channel" trip reveals some very scary facts.

In the third plotline the Skinks visit a world only partially explored by humans and find a pre-technological sentient race.  The Skinks immediately take captives to use as laborers.  The planet is apparently a staging base for the Skinks' invasion of Kingdom, a human occupied world.

Reception
Don D'Amassa in his review for Science Fiction Chronicle said "the previous volumes in this series have been readable, and this one was divergent enough that it actually held my interest throughout."

Notes

2000 American novels
American science fiction novels
2000 science fiction novels
StarFist series
Del Rey books